José González Brand, known as Pepe Brand (13 February 1900 – 1 July 1971) was a Spanish professional football player and manager associated with Sevilla FC, Real Jaén and CD Castellón.

Club career
A historical member of Sevilla in the 20s, he was one of the first footballers to play for Sevilla for his entire career, and thus be part of the so-called one-club men group.

International career
Being a Sevilla FC player, he was eligible to play for the Andalusian national team, being a member of the team that participated in the 1923-24 Prince of Asturias Cup, an inter-regional competition organized by the RFEF. Brand scored the opening goal in the quarter-finals against Valencia in an eventual 3–2 win, thus reaching the semi-finals where they were eliminated by a Castile/Madrid XI after a 1-2 loss, courtesy of a brace from Juan Monjardín.

Managerial career
As a coach, he managed Sevilla at three different times, with his second spell being the most successful as he led his side to a triumph at the 1939 Copa del Generalísimo Final, beating Racing de Ferrol by a score of 6–2.

Honours
Sevilla FC
 Copa del Generalísimo: 1 1939

References

External links
 
 Pepe Brand's biography as Sevilla FC 

1900 births
1971 deaths
Spanish footballers
Sevilla FC players
Spanish football managers
La Liga managers
Sevilla FC managers
CD Castellón managers
Association football forwards
Real Jaén managers
Segunda División managers